Qalat Airport is located less than 2.5 miles north from the center of Qalat, which is the capital of Zabul Province in Afghanistan. It is currently an air base used exclusively by members of the country's Ministry of Defense. Security in and around the airport is provided by the Afghan National Security Forces.

It will likely become a regional domestic airport in the future, which will make flying more convenient for the residents of Zabul Province. Presently, they must drive to Kandahar in the south to use a public airport or receive travelers.

See also
List of airports in Afghanistan

References 

Airports in Afghanistan